Barrio del Artista (English: "Artist's Neighborhood") is a neighborhood in the city of Puebla's historic centre, in the Mexican state of Puebla. The area has numerous spaces for artists to work and exhibit.

References

External links

 

Historic centre of Puebla
Tourist attractions in Puebla